Hayseed is the ninth studio album by the American singer-songwriter Susan Werner. It was released in 2013 (see 2013 in music). The project was commissioned by the University of Nebraska's Lied Center for Performing Arts. The album is a concept album about people and lifestyles in farm towns in rural America, with songs inspired by local characters.

Werner, an Iowa native from a farming family, has taken a strong interest in promoting local and sustainable agriculture, themes which are dealt with on the album in songs such as "Herbicides" about herbicides and marriage equality and "Snowmobiles" about global warming. The album was initially funded through PledgeMusic, with ten percent of donations earmarked for Practical Farmers of Iowa, the Midwest Organic and Sustainability Education Service (in Spring Valley, Wisconsin) and The Land Institute. Before and after the album's official release, Werner began touring the country in a series of shows called "The Hayseed Project", in which she purchases, samples, and gives away local produce before or during her shows.

Track listing
All songs written by Susan Werner

"City Kids (The Revenge of Kevin Oberbroeckling)" – 2:32
"Back to the Land" – 3:36
"Snowmobiles (The Worries of Patrick Lundquist)" – 3:39
"Bumper Crop" – 2:28
"While You Wait for the Rain" – 4:46
"Egg Money (The Confession of Irene Broghammer)" – 3:32
"Herbicides" – 2:23
"Something to be Said" – 4:00
"Plant the Stars" – 3:40
"Iowa" – 3:09
"Ode to Aldo Leopold" – 3:11
"Farm Sale December 8, 2012" – 2:33 (Hidden track)

Personnel
Susan Werner – composer, acoustic guitar, primary artist, vocals
Gilat Bailen – children's chorus
Marty Ballou – electric bass guitar, upright bass
Sonny Barbato – accordion
Fiona Campbell – children's chorus
Melissa Fine – children's chorus
Concetta Gordon – backing vocals
Jim Gwin – drums
Duke Levine – banjo, acoustic guitar, electric guitar, mandolin, octave mandolin
Laurie MacAllister – backing vocals
Maya Mokady – children's chorus
Mimi Rabson – fiddle
Steve Sadler – Dobro, acoustic guitar, lap steel guitar, mandolin, octave mandolin
Patricia Washienko – guest artist, percussion
Dagney Winner – children's chorus
Ashleigh Woolf – children's chorus

Production
Producer: Crit Harmon
Cover art Concept: Amy Reeder
Engineer: Sean Cahalin, Crit Harmon, Lisa Yves
Editing: BJ Mansuetti
Graphic design: Krista Loewen
Mastering: Glenn Barratt
Photography: Tracy Button
Video: James Davies

References

External links

Susan Werner albums
2013 albums